Reinhard Merkel (born 16 April 1950) is a professor in criminal law and philosophy of law and a retired West German swimmer. He competed at the 1968 Summer Olympics in the 200 m  and 400 m individual medley and finished in sixth place in the latter event.

After retiring from swimming he studied law at the University of Bochum and the Ruprecht-Karls University in Heidelberg. He also studied law, philosophy and literature at the Ludwig Maximilian University of Munich, where he passed his state examination. After that he worked as a researcher at the Max Planck Institute for Foreign and International Social Law and at the Institute of Philosophy in Munich.

Between 1988 and 1990 he was an editor of the newspaper Die Zeit. In 1991 he won the Jean Améry Award for Essay Writing.

After defending his PhD in 1993 in Munich and habilitation in 1997 at the Goethe University Frankfurt he worked as university professor of law in Bielefeld, Rostock and since 2000 in Hamburg.

He wrote a number of books and other publications discussing neuroethics, bioethics and embryonic stem cell manipulations. Since April 2008, he has been a member of The Hinxton Group: An International Consortium on Stem Cells, Ethics and Law, which is based in Hinxton, UK, and Baltimore, USA. In January 2011 he was elected to the German Academy of Sciences Leopoldina. He is a member of the German Ethics Council for the term 2012–2016. He argues that the Russian military intervention in Crimea was an illegal support of a Secession and not an Annexation.

Selected publications

References

1950 births
21st-century German philosophers
German ethicists
Living people
Male medley swimmers
German male swimmers
Olympic swimmers of West Germany
Philosophers of law
Swimmers at the 1968 Summer Olympics
Academic staff of the University of Hamburg
German male writers
Universiade medalists in swimming
Universiade bronze medalists for West Germany
Medalists at the 1970 Summer Universiade